Fudbalski klub Vojvodina, commonly known as Vojvodina and colloquially as Voša, is a Serbian professional football club based in Novi Sad, Vojvodina, the second largest city in Serbia, and one of the most popular clubs in the country. The club is the major part of the Vojvodina multi-sport club and currently the third oldest football club in the Serbian SuperLiga and the most successful football club in Serbia next to the rivals Crvena zvezda and Partizan Belgrade.

In its long history, Vojvodina were one of the most successful clubs in the former Yugoslavia, winning two First League titles, in 1966 and 1989, were runners-up in 1957, 1962 and 1975, achieved 3rd place in 1992 and finished 5th in the competition's all-time table. Vojvodina were also runners-up in the Yugoslav Cup in 1951. They won the UEFA Intertoto Cup in 1976, the Mitropa Cup in 1977 and were also runners-up of the Mitropa Cup in 1957 and the UEFA Intertoto Cup in 1998. From 1993 to 1997, Vojvodina achieved in the national championship 3rd place five times in a row and were runners-up in the domestic cup in 1997. They were runners-up in the Serbian SuperLiga in 2008–09 Serbian SuperLiga and
3rd place in 2007, 2008, 2011, 2012, 2013, 2017 and 2020. Vojvodina were also runners-up of the Serbian Cup in 2007, 2010, 2011 and 2013. They have won the Serbian Cup twice, winning their first title in 2014 and their second in 2020.

History

On 6 March 1914, in Sava Šijakov's weaving mill in the Temerinska Street 12, a group of students of the Serbian Orthodox high school established with the help of intellectuals and craftsman a football club in Novi Sad. The club was founded in secrecy, because the former Austro-Hungarian authorities banned larger organized gatherings of juveniles in the Vojvodina region which was inhabited mostly by Serbs. The club took the name Vojvodina, in order to emphasize the memory of the political-territorial unit of the Serbs in the "Serbian Vojvodina" in which the Serbs, at least on paper, get the same rights as all other citizens in the Habsburg Empire for which they have fought for years. The name Vojvodina means in Serbian a type of duchy, more specifically, a voivodeship. It derives from the word "vojvoda", and means "one who leads warriors" or "war leader".

Among the club founders on that day were the future textile industrialist Milenko Šijakov, the future university professor Vladimir Milićević, the future chemists Milenko Hinić, the future lawyers Radenko Rakić and Kamenko Ćirić, Gojko Tosić, Đorđe Živanov, Branko Gospođinački, the future doctor of law Kosta Hadži and others. The new club played its first match in the village of Kovilj against local club FK Šajkaš. Vojvodina played in bright blue colours and white shorts and won by 5–0. Svetozar Jocković, Jovan Ljubojević, Milorad Milićević, Dušan Kovačev, Jovan Jocković, Ozren Stojanović, Sava Ignjačev, Gavanski, Predrag Stojanović Ciga, Živojin Đeremov and Uroš Čakovac entered the record books as the first players in the history of Vojvodina. The players were mainly pupils and students, who came from Prague in the summer holidays and played only that one match, because shortly before World War I broke out. The strict hand of the Austro-Hungarian authorities stopped all Serbian organizations in Novi Sad and Vojvodina was the first time in the situation to be shut down.

After the liberation, Vojvodina resumed the work thanks to the enthusiasm of Serbian students from Prague. The first president of Vojvodina became Milenko Šijakov, son of weaving mill owner Sava Šijak, and the first secretary became Dr. Živko Bajazet, the longtime president of the Serbian merchant bank and member of the Sokol organization. The club financed solely by membership fees and by generous contributions as by Maks Grin, Daka Popović, the Novaković brothers, Ilija Balabušić and the members of Dunđerski family. Part of the Vojvodina players and management who studied in Prague, were also members of football club Slavia Prague. The Czech club supported the Vojvodina members during the difficult times before and during World War I and contributed in the development of the club. In 1920, was brought from Prague the first set of red and white jerseys. At the club meeting held on 23 July 1922, it was decided that in honour of Slavia Prague the red and white colors adorn the jerseys of Vojvodina. The coat of arms was also partially modeled after Slavia Prague's coat of arms, where the red star of the Czech team was replaced with the blue star, so that Vojvodina's coat of arms had all the colors of the Serbian flag. The first coach, technical director and chief organizer of Vojvodina was the lawyer Dr. Kosta Hadži, one of the main founder of Vojvodina and the Novi Sad Football Subassociation. Under his leadership, Vojvodina won the Novi Sad Subassociation league in 1926, which was the first trophy in its history. Vojvodina played with following players: Mihajlović, Živić, Kričkov, Popović, Vajs, Aleksić, Grgarov, Marjanović, Šević, Petrović, Dudás and Saraz. The club provided the first professional contracts to its players, and also brought professional players from abroad such as Czech Josef Čapek and Hungarians Sándor Dudás and Abraham Saraz. One of the best and most influential Vojvodina players at that time was Dušan Marković, an effective striker who played for Vojvodina from 1921 to 1935. End of the 1930s, Vojvodina brought many good players into the team, which was later known as the Millionaires team and one of the best was Jožef Velker, which became to a crucial player of the club. In 1932, 1934, 1935, 1937–1940, Vojvodina won the Novi Sad Football Subassociation league. Since then, Vojvodina begun having serious pretensions to gain promotion to the Yugoslav First League. The club failed to immediately make an impact, but during the season 1940/41, Vojvodina fought for the top. The final stage of the championship was interrupted by the beginning of World War II, and the Axis bombing, mobilization and country's occupation made the continuation of the competition impossible.

In 1962, Vojvodina was runners-up. However, the results deteriorated in the following seasons and Vojvodina even started fighting against relegation. In 1964 everything changed with Vujadin Boškov as the technical director and Branko Stanković as coach. Vujadin Boškov remodeled and modernized the club. The infrastructure was improved and a new sports center was built. It also organized a successful scouting network and the administration, headed by president Arsa Kovačević, was able to provide all necessary conditions for the competition. Coach Branko Stanković changed the style of play and shifted the emphasis on discipline and running. The only player who had a free hand was Silvester Takač, one of the best players of this generation. In 1966, Vojvodina won the Yugoslav first league for the first time with eight points ahead of second placed Dinamo Zagreb. Members of this generation were Silvester Takač, Ilija Pantelić, Žarko Nikolić, Ivica Brzić, Rajko Aleksić, Đorđe Pavlić, Dobrivoje Trivić, Stevan Sekereš, Đorđe Milić and Stevan Nešticki.

In 1989, under the new coach Ljupko Petrović, Vojvodina spent almost the whole championship as league leaders. During the season, Vojvodina won at home against all top four Yugoslav clubs. Partizan Belgrade was defeated by goals by 3–2, Dinamo Zagreb by 4–1, Hajduk Split by 2–0 and finally Red Star by 3–1 in front of more than 27,000 spectators. Vojvodina played the decisive game for the championship against Sloboda Tuzla and needed a win to clinch the title ahead of rival Red Star. Vojvodina won in front of 27.000 spectator by goals from Šestić (twice), Vorkapić and Vujačić with 4–2. The final whistle sparked off a huge celebration inside the stadium as well as a massive celebratory pitch invasion. The second championship trophy was finally won with three points ahead, after 23 years of waiting, by the new generation of players, such as Siniša Mihajlović, Miloš Šestić, Slaviša Jokanović, Budimir Vujačić, Ljubomir Vorkapić, Miroslav Tanjga, Goran Kartalija, Dušan Mijić, Svetozar Šapurić, Čedo Maras, Stevan Milovac, Dragan Punišić and Zoran Mijucić. The following season, Vojvodina fell unhappily in the first round of European Cup against Honvéd Budapest, although most of the key players from the previous league-winning season remained. Losing the first leg by 1–0 at Honvéd was extremely disappointing. During the second leg, things went much better as Vojvodina got up 2–0 by goals from Siniša Mihajlović and Miroslav Tanjga, however a late own goal by defender Dragan Gaćeša dashed Vojvodina hopes of progressing further.

In 1990, Vojvodina failed to defend the previously acquired title and finished the season as 11th. The disintegration of Yugoslavia, the civil war (1992–1995), the inflation and the UN sanctions have hit the Yugoslav football teams hard. The difficult situation forced Vojvodina to sell its best players and the champions team broke up in the early nineties. However, Vojvodina's management, led by Milutin Popivoda, succeeded to assemble a new team. The coaches, mainly Milorad Kosanović, made also a great combination of players from Vojvodina's excellent youth like, Jovo Bosančić, Goran Šaula, Radoslav Samardžić, Goran Ćurko and Srđan Bajčetić, and players from other areas like Aleksandar Kocić, Dejan Govedarica, Goran Jezdimirović, Miodrag Pantelić, Vesko Mihajlović and Zoltan Sabo. From 1992, Vojvodina achieved in the championship always the 3rd place, 6 times in a row, and received the call of the eternal third. In 1995, they finished the first half of the season on the first place. Because of the UN sanctions, in this period Vojvodina, as all the rest of the clubs from FR Yugoslavia, was not allowed to compete in European competitions and the question on how this generation would have played on the international scene was left. However, in 1995, Vojvodina played a friendly match in Amsterdam against Ajax, in the season when they won the UEFA Champions League, where the "old lady" of Serbian football defeated them by 3–2. In 1997, Vojvodina achieved also the cup final, but lost against Red Star. In 1998, Vojvodina started one after another victory in UEFA Intertoto Cup. After eliminating Stabæk (2–0, 2–2), Örebro SK (3–0, 1–0) and Baltika Kaliningrad (3–0, 1–0) in the first three rounds, Vojvodina played the semi-final against SC Bastia. In the first leg, held in Bastia, Vojvodina suffered a 2–0 defeat. Although they were not given any chances in the return leg in Novi Sad, Vojvodina pulled off a convincing 4–0 win. The cup final was played against Werder Bremen. The first match in Bremen was lost by 1–0 and the return game ended with 1–1. Vojvodina coach was Tomislav Manojlović and the red-white jersey was worn by players like Nikola Lazetić, Zdravko Drinčić, Vidak Bratić, Jovan Tanasijević, Vladimir Mudrinić, Zoran Janković, Dragan Žilić, Mićo Vranješ, Saša Cilinšek, Vladimir Matijašević and Leo Lerinc.

In the 2000/01 season, Vojvodina fought unexpectedly for competitive survival in the elite and the club ran into financial problems. The departure of the club director Svetozar Šapurić opened the descent and Vojvodina entered into a several-year long crisis. In a short period of time, numerous managers and coaches were changed regularly and the situation deteriorated more and more. This was a period of mediocre results and the circle of selling the best players to richer European clubs after just a couple of seasons of first-team football and replacing them with fresh young talents. Despite that, at that period, a large number of class players worn the jersey of Vojvodina like Miloš Krasić, Milan Jovanović, Milan Stepanov, Ranko Despotović, Vlada Avramov, Bojan Neziri, Vidak Bratić, Jovan Tanasijević, Radoslav Batak, Milan Vještica, Milan Belić and Miodrag Stošić. In 2005, as a final act of desperation, the organised supporters, the Firmaši and Vojvodina's oldest supporters, called the Stara Garda (English: Old Guard), gathered and took over the assembly of the club to make the public aware on their dissatisfaction and the bad situation in the club. In the same year, the newly arrived club president Ratko Butorović announced a better future for club. The squad was improved and in fact followed the stabilization and the rise of the club, both financial and in terms of results. Also, the management announced large reconstructions of the stadium and training facility, which were realized in the following years.

Many players contributed to these successes, some of them are Gojko Kačar, Dušan Tadić, Dragan Mrđa, Marcelo Pletsch, Aboubakar Oumarou, Ranko Despotović, Željko Brkić, Daniel Mojsov, Slobodan Medojević, Miroslav Stevanović, Vlatko Grozdanoski, Giorgi Merebashvili,	Miroslav Vulićević, Brana Ilić, Branislav Trajković, Vuk Mitošević, Damir Kahriman, Janko Tumbasević, Darko Lovrić, Savo Pavićević, Joseph Kizito, Danijel Aleksić, Mario Gjurovski, Aleksandar Katai, Nino Pekarić, Vladimir Buač, Nikola Petković and Stephen Appiah.

Club colours and crest

Vojvodina played its first match in bright blue colours and white shorts. Some of the first Vojvodina players and management studied in Prague and were also members of football club Slavia Prague. The Czech club supported the Vojvodina members during the difficult times before and during World War I and contributed in the development of the club. In 1920, was brought from Prague the first set of red and white jerseys. At the club meeting held on 23 July 1922, it was decided that in honour of Slavia Prague the red and white colors adorn the jerseys of Vojvodina. The coat of arms was also partially modeled after Slavia Prague's coat of arms, where the red star of the Czech club was replaced with the blue star, so that Vojvodina's coat of arms had all the colors of the Serbian flag.

Stadium and training facility

Stadium

The home field of Vojvodina is the Karađorđe Stadium. It is named after Karađorđe, the leader of the First Serbian uprising against the Ottoman occupation. Formerly, it was known as the City Stadium or Vojvodina Stadium, but it was renamed on request of the Vojvodina fans in 2007 to Karađorđe Stadium. However, it was in fact the older and original name of the stadium that was used from its foundation until the end of World War II. With a total capacity of about 20 000, of which 15 000 seats, it is one of the largest football stadiums in Serbia. The stadium has a new athletic track, and it is equipped with new Philips LED lights and 1700 lux strong floodlights. The stadium features a VIP sector with 150 seats, VIP café-restaurant, press center, and 14 fully equipped broadcast cabins. It is also the home ground for the Serbian U-21 football team.

In 2012, the executive board announced further reconstructions of Karadjordje Stadium. These will include a new South stand, the reconstruction of Eastern and Southwest stands, and the covering of the whole stadium. The reconstruction will increase the stadium's capacity approximately to 19,500 seats.

Training facility

The FC Vujadin Boškov is the club's training facility and youth academy base. The sports complex is located in Veternik, Novi Sad and was named after football legend Vujadin Boškov. The center has over 85,000 square meters of sports facilities and 2,000 square meters of enclosed space. It has six courts, one with artificial grass and two surrounded by bleachers. It has 8 double rooms and 2 luxury suites, and each unit have most modern equipment. A kitchen supplies the senior team and all the younger categories. The sports complex has also a changing room, gym, medical center, laundry facilities and in the main building houses two press centers. Recreational facility and amusement at both facilities include TV, billiards, table football, computers, air conditioners and other modern equipment. The entire complex is managed by a team of highly qualified personnel. A special service for the 24-hour security of the sports facility is also available. The sport complex is today among the highest value in Southeast Europe.

Youth academy

Famous for its excellent football youth work, its good scout network, the modern club's training ground and the youth academy base FC Vujadin Boškov, which is well equipped and one of the most prestigious in the Southeast Europe, Vojvodina has developed renowned professional footballers such as Miloš Krasić, Gojko Kačar, Milan Stepanov, Srđan Bajčetić (retired), Dušan Tadić, Željko Brkić, Danijel Aleksić, Slobodan Medojević, Aleksandar Katai, Goran Šaula, Jovo Bosančić, Damir Stojak, Miroslav Stevanović, Sergej Milinković-Savić, Mijat Gaćinović, Milan Jovanović among others. In 2008 and 2009, Vojvodina organized together with the A.C. Milan a training camp at the FC Vujadin Boškov. The Vojvodina junior players were trained there by Milan training techniques and methods. In 2012, Vojvodina's team, led by coach Milan Kosanović, won the Serbian youth championship.

Supporters

One of the first organized supports of Vojvodina fans was recorded in 1931, at the away game against Mačva Šabac. Already in 1937, the first organized supporters club was established, probably the first organized supporter group in the former Yugoslavia. Although the club had numerous supporters throughout the history, more organized groups emerged end of the 1970s and beginning of the 1980s. In 1989, for the first time starts the idea of uniting of all the smaller supporter groups. This idea is realized and the group was named Red Firm. A few days later, several youngsters established the group Firma (English: The Firm) as one of the subgroups, because they wanted a Serbian name for their group. The disintegration of Yugoslavia and its follows led to stagnation in all Yugoslavian supporter groups so that in 1992, the Red Firm fell apart and the Firma took over the leadership of the organized supports. The members of Firma call themselves Firmaši (English:Members of the Firma), the plural of the singular form Firmaš, and belongs today to the top supporter groups in Serbia. They are more known as ultras, not hooligans. However, they always protected the name and honour of FK Vojvodina, Novi Sad and Serbia, putting themselves against all who were not doing enough for the club. The Firmaši gather in the north stand of the Karađorđe Stadium, from where they fiercely support their club. Besides football, they also support other sport sections of the Vojvodina Novi Sad Sport Association. The club also has a group of their oldest supporters, called the Stara Garda (English: Old Guard) and who are for more than 40 years in the east stand of the stadium.

Honours

Domestic

League
Yugoslav First League
Winners: (2) 1965–66, 1988–89
Runners-up: (3) 1956–57, 1961–62, 1974–75
Serbian SuperLiga
Runners-up: (1) 2008–09
Yugoslav Summer Champions League:
 Winners: (1) 1970

Cups
Yugoslav Cup
Runners-up: (1) 1951
Serbia and Montenegro Cup
Runners-up: (1) 1996–97
Serbian Cup
Winners: (2) 2013–14, 2019–20
Runners-up: (4) 2006–07, 2009–10, 2010–11, 2012–13

Super Cups
Yugoslav Super Cup
Runners-up: 1989

International
European Cup / UEFA Champions League
Quarter-finalists: 1966–67
UEFA Intertoto Cup
Winners: 1976
Runners-up: 1998
Mitropa Cup
Winners: 1976–77
Runners-up: 1957
Inter-Cities Fairs Cup
Quarter-finalists: 1961–62, 1967–68

Individual awards

Yugoslav First League top scorers

First League of Serbia and Montenegro top scorers

Serbian SuperLiga top scorers

Serbian SuperLiga Footballer of the Year
 Dragan Mrđa (2010)
Serbian SuperLiga Young Footballer of the Year
 Slobodan Medojević (2011)

Club records
Radomir Krstić is Vojvodinas's record-holder by number of appearances (613 matches). The goal-scoring record-holder is striker Todor Veselinović, with 586 goals (of it 130 goals in the Yugoslav championship). He was also the top scorer of the Yugoslav league in 1956, 1957, 1958 and 1961. In addition, Vojvodina had two more top scorers in its history. In 1993, Vesko Mihajlović with 22 goals and in 2010, Dragan Mrdja also with 22 goals. The first player of Vojvodina, who wore the representative jersey of Yugoslavia was Abraham Saraz Eugen in 1922, where he scored two goals in the match against Czechoslovakia. Since then, numerous Vojvodina football players were in the Yugoslav national team and Todor Veselinović, Vujadin Boškov, Zdravko Rajkov, Dobrosav Krstić, Silvester Takač, Žarko Nikolić, Dobrivoje Trivić and Siniša Mihajlović (a former player of Inter Milan) are among them.

Player records

Club all-time European record

UEFA ranking

Best results in European competitions

Biggest win in UEFA competition:

European matches since 2010

Current squad
Updated 11 February 2023

Players with multiple nationalities
   Marko Bjeković
   Stefan Đorđević
   Milan Lazarević
   Yves Baraye

Out on loan

Technical staff
Updated 1 March 2023

Club management
Updated 1 June 2022

Notable players
For all players, see: List of FK Vojvodina players.

To appear in this section a player must have either:
 Played at least 100 games in Serbian top league.
 Played at least 80 games for the club.
 Set a club record or won an individual award while at the club.
 Played at least one international match for their national team at any time.

  Radivoj Božić
  Svetozar Đanić
  Rodoljub Malenčić
  Dušan Marković
  Ivan Medarić
  Božidar Petrović
  Ján Podhradský
  Zvonko Požega
  Jenő Ábrahám Saraz
  Jožef Velker
  Rajko Aleksić
  Stevan Bena
  Vujadin Boškov
  Dragan Bošnjak
  Ivica Brzić
  Miroslav Ćurčić
  Čedo Maras
  Josif Ilić
  Zvonko Ivezić
  Aleksandar Ivoš
  Željko Jurčić
  Dobrosav Krstić
  Miodrag Kustudić
  Zoran Marić
  Dušan Mijić
  Đorđe Milić
  Sima Milovanov
  Zoran Mijucić
  Petar Nikezić
  Žarko Nikolić
  Martin Novoselac
  Ilija Pantelić
  Slobodan Pavković
  Đorđe Pavlić
  Zdravko Rajkov
  Vasa Rutonjski
  Ratko Svilar
  Svetozar Šapurić
  Stevan Sekereš
  Miloš Šestić
  Ratko Svilar
  Slavko Svinjarević
  Silvester Takač
  Miroslav Tanjga
  Dobrivoje Trivić
  Todor Veselinović
  Ljubomir Vorkapić
  Nebojša Vučković
  Đorđe Vujkov
  Miroslav Vukašinović
  Josip Zemko
  Marijan Zovko
  Milan Belić
  Nikoslav Bjegović
  Igor Bogdanović
  Saša Cilinšek
  Ljubiša Dunđerski
  Dejan Govedarica
  Goran Jezdimirović
  Slaviša Jokanović
  Đorđe Jokić
  Aleksandar Kocić
  Radovan Krivokapić
  Nikola Lazetić
  Vladan Lukić
  Siniša Mihajlović
  Vesko Mihajlović
  Bojan Neziri
  Miodrag Pantelić
  Zoltan Sabo
  Radoslav Samardžić
  Goran Šaula
  Damir Stojak
  Budimir Vujačić
  Dragan Žilić
  Bratislav Živković
  Danijel Aleksić
  Enver Alivodić
  Vlada Avramov
  Željko Brkić
  Vladimir Buač
  Ranko Despotović
  Igor Đurić
  Mijat Gaćinović
  Brana Ilić
  Dimitrije Injac
  Milan Jovanić
  Milan Jovanović
  Gojko Kačar
  Damir Kahriman
  Andrija Kaluđerović
  Aleksandar Katai
  Miloš Krasić
  Sergej Milinković-Savić
  Dragan Mrđa
  Aleksandar Paločević
  Nino Pekarić
  Milan Stepanov
  Dušan Tadić
  Saša Todić
  Branislav Trajković
  Veseljko Trivunović
  Jagoš Vuković
  Miroslav Vulićević
  Goran Kartalija
  Nemanja Bilbija
  Daniel Graovac
  Siniša Mulina
  Bojan Nastić
  Miroslav Stevanović
  Nemanja Supić
  Amir Teljigović
  Stojan Vranješ
  Zoran Janković
  Stefan Cebara
  John Mary
  Aboubakar Oumarou
  Veldin Karić
  Josef Čapek
  Anselme Délicat
  Giorgi Merebashvili
  Sadick Adams
  Stephen Appiah
  Yaw Antwi
  Almami Moreira
  János Borsó
  Ilija Spasojević
  Daniel Avramovski
  Mario Đurovski
  Vlatko Grozdanoski
  Sašo Miloševski
  Daniel Mojsov
  Borislav Tomovski
  Radoslav Batak
  Ivan Fatić
  Mirko Ivanić
  Vasko Kalezić
  Damir Kojašević
  Šaleta Kordić
  Nebojša Kosović
  Risto Lakić
  Savo Pavićević
  Nemanja Sekulić
  Jovan Tanasijević
  Janko Tumbasević
  Igor Vujačić
  Marko Vukčević
  Simon Vukčević
  Nnaemeka Ajuru
  Alin Stoica
  Niclas Nyhlén
  Joseph Kizito
  Eugene Sseppuya

For the list of all current and former players with Wikipedia article, please see: :Category:FK Vojvodina players.

Managerial history

  Kosta Hadži (1924–1926)
  Otto Necas (1926–1928)
  Boško Simonović (1929)
  Otto Necas (1929–30)
  Otto Hamacek (1931–32)
  Károly Nemes (1933)
  Willy Schürmann (1934–35)
  Fritz Levitus (1936–1938)
  Milorad Ognjanov (1938)
  Károly Nemes (1939)
  János Neu (1940–1941)
  Milorad Ognjanov (1945–1947)
  Bane Sekulić (1948–1951)
  Ljubiša Broćić (1952)
  Milorad Ognjanov (1952)
  Gustav Lechner (1953–1957)
  Antal Lyka (1957–1959)
  Ratomir Čabrić (1959–60)
  Radomir Momirski (1960–61)
  Franja Hirman (1961–1964)
  Branko Stanković (1964–1967)
  Zdravko Rajkov (1967–68)
  Ratomir Čabrić (1968–69)
  Dragoljub Milošević (1969–1973)
  Gojko Zec (1973–74)
  Todor Veselinović (1974–1977)
  Branko Stanković (1977–78)
  Milorad Pavić (1978)
  Ivica Brzić (1978–79)
  Marko Valok (1979–80)
  Dušan Drašković (1980–1983)
  Tomislav Kaloperović (1983)
  Josip Duvančić (1983–84)
  Jovan Kovrlija (1984–85)
  Vukašin Višnjevac (1985)
  Tomislav Kaloperović (1985)
  Vladimir Savić (1986)
  Željko Jurčić (1986)
  Tonko Vukušić (1986–87)
  Ivica Brzić (1987–88)
  Ljupko Petrović (1988–1990)
  Ivica Brzić (1990–91)
  Milorad Kosanović (1991–95)
  Dragoljub Bekvalac /  Gjoko Hadžievski (1995–96)
  Ljupko Petrović (1996–97)
  Josip Pirmajer (1997–98)
  Tomislav Manojlović (1998–00)
  Dragoljub Bekvalac (2000)
  Dragan Okuka (2000)
  Dragoljub Bekvalac (2000–01)
  Miroslav Vukašinović (2002–03)
  Josif Ilić (2003)
  Branko Smiljanić (2004–9 November 2004)
  Vladimir Petrović (24 November 2004 – 26 December 2004)
  Milan Đuričić (27 December 2004 – 14 August 2005)
  Zoran Marić (20 August 2005 – 13 August 2006)
  Milovan Rajevac (17 August 2006 – 17 September 2007)
  Ivica Brzić (18 September 2007 – 1 June 2008)
  Dragoljub Bekvalac (4 June 2008 – 20 October 2008)
  Dragan Radojičić (21 October 2008 – 23 December 2008)
  Ljupko Petrović (23 December 2008 – 8 March 2009)
  Zoran Marić (9 March 2009 – 8 June 2009)
  Dragoslav Stepanović (8 June 2009 – 2 October 2009)
  Branko Babić (11 October 2009 – 9 March 2010)
  Milan Đuričić (10 March 2010 – 18 May 2010)
  Zoran Milinković (27 May 2010 – 30 May 2011)
  Dejan Vukićević (15 August 2011 – 12 April 2012)
  Spasoje Jelačić (interim) (13 April 2012 – 23 April 2012)
   Zlatomir Zagorčić (interim) (23 April 2012 – 31 May 2012)
   Zlatomir Zagorčić (31 May 2012 – 12 September 2012)
  Nebojša Vignjević (12 September 2012 – 4 June 2013)
  Marko Nikolić (7 June 2013 – 9 December 2013)
  Branko Babić (3 January 2014 – 19 May 2014)
  Zoran Marić (19 June 2014 – 16 March 2015)
   Zlatomir Zagorčić (17 March 2015 – 22 October 2015)
  Nenad Lalatović (11 November 2015 – 17 December 2016)
  Dragan Ivanović (23 December 2016 – 3 April 2017)
  Aleksandar Veselinović (4 April 2017 – 21 April 2017)
   Radoslav Batak (23 April 2017 – 29 June 2017)
  Nenad Vanić (30 June 2017 – 9 September 2017)
  Vladimir Buač (21 September 2017 – 30 November 2017)
  Ilija Stolica (23 December 2017 – 4 April 2018)
  Aleksandar Veselinović (9 April 2018 – 7 September 2018)
  Dragan Okuka (7 September 2018 – 25 November 2018)
  Radovan Krivokapić (25 November 2018 – 29 June 2019)
  Nenad Lalatović (29 June 2019 – 26 May 2021)
  Slavoljub Đorđević (26 May 2021 – 14 March 2022)
  Dragan Radojičić (15 March 2022 – 30 May 2022)
  Milan Rastavac (1 June 2022 – 25 Februar 2023)
  Radoslav Batak (25 Februar 2023—Pressent)

Kit manufacturers and shirt sponsors

Shirt sponsors and manufacturers

References

External links

 Official
 
 FK Vojvodina at UEFA

 Unofficial
 fkvojvodina.com 
 napredvosa.com (archived 23 July 2011) 

 Supporters
 Firma1989.com 

 Other
 Vojvodina Novi Sad at kapiten.rs (archived 23 June 2011)
 Vojvodina Novi Sad at utakmica.rs

 
Football clubs in Yugoslavia
Football clubs in Vojvodina
Football clubs in Novi Sad
Association football clubs established in 1914
1914 establishments in Serbia